Suzuyo Takazato (高里鈴代 Takazato Suzuyo, born 1940) is a Japanese politician, feminist and peace activist. She helps female victims of sexual violence.

Career 
From 1989 to 2004, she was a member of the Naha city council.

Takazato founded the organisation Okinawa Women Act Against Military Violence in 1995. She campaigns and protests against American military presence in Okinawa and sexual violence committed by American soldiers to Okinawa women and children. She contributed to the establishment of a rape crisis center in Okinawa for the victims of sexual assaults. She raised her voice against American military bases stationing in Okinawa. She questions the concept of militarized security and peace forced by military intervention. Takazato sees the link between violence against women and military violence. Her activism contributed to vast protests of inhabitants of Okinawa against American military presence in 1995.“Fifty-three years is long enough. We have really suffered“. “Prostitution and rape are the military system’s outlets for pent up aggression and methods of maintaining control and discipline – the target being local community women.”

Awards and recognition 
 Avon Women's Prize 1996
 Takako Doi Human Rights Award 1997
 Okinawa Times Award 2011
She was among 1000 women who were nominated for the Nobel Peace Prize in 2005.

References 

Japanese feminists
Japanese pacifists
Ryukyuan people
1940 births
People from Naha
Living people
Japanese activists